Pasavalai is a 1956 Indian Tamil-language historical fantasy film, directed by A. S. Nagarajan produced by T. R. Sundaram of Modern Theatres, and written by Pa. Kannan. Music was composed by Viswanathan–Ramamoorthy. It stars M. K. Radha, V. Gopalakrishnan, G. Varalakshmi, M. N. Rajam and Kumari Rajamani, with T. P. Muthulakshmi and A. Karunanidhi providing comic relief. The film was a moderate success at the box office.

Plot 
A king is accused by his people of shielding his younger brother, who is after women. Touched to the quick, the king abandons his throne and walks out with his Queen and children. He wanders in the woods, looking for peace. The family gets separated. The king becomes mentally deranged, while his wife loses the children and works as a maid in a house. The children are rescued by some people including a leader of a gang of thieves. The brother meets the king in the woods, apologises for what had happened and promises to cure him of his mental illness. He meets a young woman, who has a magic cave with herbs that can cure his brother. He goes in search of it, but the woman, unable to seduce the repentant brother, converts him into a dog. However, he succeeds in curing the king and dies in his arms. The blind king is saved by a princess who falls in love with him. She soon realises that he is still thinking of his first queen. After interesting twists, the king and the queen are united with the children and the princess dies accidentally.

Cast 

 Male cast
 M. K. Radha
 V. K. Ramasamy
 V. Gopalakrishnan
 A. Karunanidhi
 S. M. Thirupathisami
 M. N. Krishnan
 M. R. Santhanam
 K. Natarajan
 Sairam
 Master Bhaji
 Master Venkatesh
 Sundararajan

 Female cast
 G. Varalakshmi
 M. N. Rajam
 Kumari Rajamani
 T. P. Muthulakshmi
 Bhagyam
 T. K. Rajeswari
 Tiger (Dog)
Dance
 E. V. Saroja

Soundtrack 
Music by Viswanathan–Ramamoorthy and lyrics were written by Pattukkottai Kalyanasundaram and A. Maruthakasi. Many songs become popular, such as "Anbinaal... Paasavalai", sung by C. S. Jayaraman and "Lol Lol Machchaan Unna Parthu", sung by Jikki.

References

External links 
 

1950s historical fantasy films
1950s Tamil-language films
1956 films
Films scored by Viswanathan–Ramamoorthy
Indian black-and-white films
Indian historical fantasy films